Micreremites rasalis is a moth of the family Noctuidae first described by Warren in 1891. It is found in Sri Lanka.

References

Moths of Asia
Moths described in 1891